Smeringurus is a small genus of scorpions native to Mexico and the southwestern United States within the family Vaejovidae. It is closely related to the genus Paruroctonus, of which it was formerly considered a subgenus.

Species 
List according to The Scorpion Files:
 Smeringurus aridus (Soleglad, 1972)
 Smeringurus grandis (Williams, 1970)
 Smeringurus mesaensis (Stahnke, 1957)
 Smeringurus vachoni (Stahnke, 1961)

References

Vaejovidae